Peristeri B.C., or Peristeri Athens B.C. (Greek: Περιστερίου K.A.E.) is a Greek professional basketball club that is located in Peristeri, Greece, which is a suburban municipality in west Athens. The club's full name is Gymnastikos Syllogos Peristeriou K.A.E. (Γυμναστικός Σύλλογος Περιστερίου K.A.E.). It is a part of the G.S. Peristeri (Γ.Σ. Περιστερίου) multi-sports club. The club was founded on October 22, 1971.  

The club's emblem is the dove symbol, and the club's team colors are yellow and blue. For the 2022–23 season, the team competes in the Greek Basket League, which is the top-tier level league in Greece, as well as in the European-wide secondary level competition, the FIBA Basketball Champions League (BCL).

History

Early years and rise of the club
The club began play in the 1971–72 season. In the 1982–83 season, Peristeri Athens won the second level of Greek pro basketball, which was at that time, the Greek B League. In the 1988–89 season, Peristeri won the new Greek 2nd Division championship. In the following season, of 1989–90, Peristeri played games for the first time, in the top-tier level Greek League.

In the subsequent years in that era, the team was very successful, and many well-known basketball players played for the club. During this era, Peristeri competed in the European 3rd-tier level FIBA Korać Cup seven times (in the seasons 1991–92, 1992–93, 1993–94, 1994–95, 1996–97, 1997–98, and 1999–00). Well-known players such as Audie Norris, Marko Jarić, Milan Gurović, Angelos Koronios, Michalis Pelekanos, Kostas Tsartsaris, and Alphonso Ford played for the club in that era.

In the 2000–01 season, led by the great scorer Ford, Peristeri finished in second place in the Greek League, in the regular season. The club also competed in the European top-tier level EuroLeague competition, during the 2000–01 and 2001–02 seasons. In the 2002–03 season, Peristeri competed in the European secondary level FIBA EuroCup Challenge. In the 2003–04 season, the club played in the European 3rd-tier level FIBA EuroChallenge.

Decline of the club
Following the 2003–04 season, Peristeri was downgraded to the third division Greek B League, due to great financial troubles within the Peristeri Sports Club. For the 2007–08 season, Peristeri Athens returned to the second division Greek A2 League, after finishing in second place in the Greek B League, in the 2006–07 season. Cezary Trybański signed with the team for the 2007–08 season. 

After the 2012–13 Greek Basket League season, Peristeri was again relegated down to the Greek A2 League. Due to economic issues, the club did not take part in the A2 League in the following season, and instead competed in the Greek B League (Greek 3rd Division).

In the 2014–15 season, Peristeri finished in fourth place, in the First Group of the Greek B League. Nevertheless, due to the withdrawal of Panionios Athens from the Greek A2 League, Peristeri was promoted back up to the A2 League, as they replaced Panionios in the competition.

Return to European-wide competitions
In the 2017–18 season, Peristeri won its third Greek 2nd Division championship. The team broke the league's win–loss record during the season, and finished with an overall record of 29 wins and just 1 loss. Thus, the club was promoted up to the top-tier level Greek Basket League for the 2018–19 season. The arrival of head coach Argiris Pedoulakis proved to be a key factor for the team. With Pedoulakis coaching, and a core of quality players, Peristeri finished second in the regular season and in fourth place overall at the end of the league's playoffs, which secured its return to European-wide competitions. 

The club joined one of the two European-wide secondary leagues, the FIBA Basketball Champions League (BCL), for the 2019–20 season. The team had a successful BCL season, as they managed to progress to the round of 16 of the FIBA Champions League, where they were ultimately eliminated by the Israeli Super League club Hapoel Jerusalem. Peristeri finished in the third position of the 2019–20 Greek Basket League, although the season Greek League season ended prematurely, in March 2020, due to the COVID-19 pandemic in Greece.

Peristeri's 2020–21 Greek Basket League season wasn't as successful as the previous one, as they finished in sixth place in the league. During that season, the team used three different head coaches. The team also struggled to develop proper player chemistry throughout the duration of the season. Ultimately, Peristeri was unable to match their high points of the previous two seasons. In August of 2022, the team was given the new sponsorship name of Peristeri B.C. Athens Bwin, after the club secured a naming rights deal with Bwin, for the purposes of increasing the team's budget, as part of an overall effort by the club to position itself in a higher echelon within the Greek Basket League.

Peristeri hired international basketball legend Vassilis Spanoulis to its head coaching position, for the 2022–23 season. Spanoulis guided the team to its first ever appearance in the Final of the Greek Cup competition. However, they were defeated in the 2022–23 Greek Cup final by Olympiacos Piraeus.

Logos

In international competitions

Peristeri has an overall record, from 1991 to 1992 (first participation) to 2003–04 (last participation) of: 67 wins and 58 losses, plus 1 tie in, 126 games played in all the European-wide professional club basketball competitions.

Arenas
Peristeri plays its home games at the Peristeri Arena, which has a seating capacity of 4,000 people. The club has also played home games at the Peristeri Olympic Boxing Hall.

Roster

Depth chart

Titles and honours

Domestic competitions
Greek A2 League (2nd Division)
Champions (3): 1988–89, 2008–09, 2017–18

Greek B League: (2nd Division / 3rd Division)
Champions (3): 1982–83 (2nd), 2006–07 (3rd), 2016–17 (3rd)

Greek Cup: 
Runners-up (1): 2022–23

Greek Super Cup: 
Runners-up (1): 2020

Seasons
Scroll down to see more.

Notable players 

Greece:
  Dimitris Agravanis
  Ioannis Bourousis
  Efthimis Bakatsias
 - Michael Bramos
  Dimitris Despos
  Periklis Dorkofikis
  Charis Giannopoulos
  Argiris Kambouris
  Dimitris Kompodietas
  Angelos Koronios
  Georgios Makaras
  Antonis Mantzaris
  Vangelis Mantzaris
  Vangelis Margaritis
  Dimitris Mavroeidis
  Ioannis Milonas
  Manolis Papamakarios
  Dimitris Papanikolaou
  Georgios Papagiannis
  Argyris Pedoulakis
  Michalis Pelekanos
  Alekos Petroulas
  Michalis Polytarchou
  Christos Saloustros
  Ioannis Sioutis
  Kostas Tsartsaris
  Georgios Tsiakos
  Panagiotis Vasilopoulos

Europe:
  Michael Andersen
 - Milan Gurović
 - Marko Jarić
  Jure Močnik
  Hugues Occansey
 - Aleksey Savrasenko
  Tomasz Gielo
  Cezary Trybański

USA:
 - Kee-Kee Clark
  Byron Dinkins
  Alphonso Ford
  Reece Gaines
  Gary Grant
  Steven Gray
  Ryan Harrow
  Buck Johnson
  Priest Lauderdale
  Audie Norris
  Andre Hutson
  Pete Mickeal
  Marlon Maxey
  Terran Petteway
  Larry Stewart
  Randy White

Africa:
  Yanick Moreira
   Ben Bentil

Retired numbers

Head coaches

References

External links
Peristeri B.C. official site 
G.S. Peristeri official site 
Greek Basket League team profile 
Greek Basket League team profile 
Eurobasket.com Peristeri BC Athens team profile
Euroleague.net Peristeri team profile
Official fan site 
Official YouTube channel 

 
G.S. Peristeri
Basketball teams established in 1971
Basketball teams in Greece